Caspase 12 is a protein that in humans is encoded by the CASP12 gene. The protein belongs to a family of enzymes called caspases which cleave their substrates at C-terminal aspartic acid residues.  It is closely related to caspase 1 and other members of the caspase family, known as inflammatory caspases, which process and activate inflammatory cytokines such as interleukin 1 and interleukin 18.

Gene 

It is found on chromosome 11 in humans in a locus with other inflammatory caspases.
CASP12 orthologs have been identified in numerous mammals for which complete genome data are available.

Clinical significance 

The CASP12 gene is subject to polymorphism, which can generate a full-length caspase protein (Csp12L) or an inactive truncated form (Csp12S). The functional form appears to be confined to people of African descent and is linked with susceptibility to sepsis; people carrying the functional gene have decreased responses to bacterial molecules such as lipopolysaccharide (LPS).

A study in May 2009 by McGill University Health Centre has suggested that estrogen may serve to block the production of caspase-12, resulting in a stronger inflammatory reaction to bacterial pathogens. The trials were carried out on laboratory mice which had been implanted with the human caspase-12 gene.

The inactive truncated form (Csp12S) of the CASP12 gene was spread and nearly fixed in non-African populations due to positive selection beginning perhaps 60–100 thousand years ago. Its selective advantage is thought to be sepsis resistance in populations that experienced more infectious diseases as population sizes and densities increased.

References

External links
 The MEROPS online database for peptidases and their inhibitors: C14.013

EC 3.4.22
Caspases